Frédéric Auguste Bartholdi (2 August 1834 – 4 October 1904) was a French sculptor and painter. He is best known for designing Liberty Enlightening the World, commonly known as the Statue of Liberty.

Early life and education
Bartholdi was born in Colmar, France, 2 August 1834. He was born to a family of Alsatian Protestant heritage, with his family name adopted from Barthold. His parents were Jean Charles Bartholdi (1791–1836) and Augusta Charlotte Bartholdi (1801–1891). Frédéric Auguste Bartholdi was the youngest of their four children, and one of only two to survive infancy, along with the oldest brother, Jean-Charles, who became a lawyer and editor.

Bartholdi's father, a property owner and counselor to the prefecture, died when Bartholdi was two years old. Afterwards, Bartholdi moved with his mother and his older brother Jean-Charles to Paris, where another branch of their family resided. With the family often returning to spend long periods of time in Colmar, the family maintained ownership and visited their house in Alsace, which later became the Bartholdi Museum in 1922. While in Colmar, Bartholdi took drawing lessons from Martin Rossbach. In Paris, he studied sculpture with Antoine Étex. He also studied architecture under Henri Labrouste and Eugène-Emmanuel Viollet-le-Duc.

Bartholdi attended the Lycée Louis-le-Grand in Paris, and received a baccalauréat in 1852. He then went on to study architecture at the École nationale supérieure des Beaux-Arts as well as painting under Ary Scheffer in his studio in the Rue Chaptal, now the Musée de la Vie Romantique. Later, Bartholdi turned his attention to sculpture, which afterward exclusively occupied him and his life.

Career

Early sculptures and work in Colmar

In 1853, Bartholdi submitted a Good Samaritan-themed sculptural group to the Paris Salon of 1853. The statue was later recreated in bronze. Within two years of his Salon debut, Bartholdi was commissioned by his hometown of Colmar to sculpt a bronze memorial of Jean Rapp, a Napoleonic General. In 1855 and 1856 Bartholdi traveled in Yemen and Egypt with travel companions such as Jean-Léon Gérôme and other "orientalist" painters. The trip sparked Bartholdi's interest in colossal sculpture.

In 1869, Bartholdi returned to Egypt to propose a new lighthouse to be built at the entrance of the Suez Canal, which was newly completed. The lighthouse, which was to be called Egypt Carrying the Light to Asia and shaped as a massive draped figure holding a torch, was not commissioned. Both the khedive and Lesseps declined the proposed statue from Bartholdi, citing the high cost. The Port Said Lighthouse was built instead, by François Coignet in 1869.

The war and Statue of Liberty

Bartholdi served in the Franco-Prussian War of 1870 as a squadron leader of the National Guard, and as a liaison officer to Italian General Giuseppe Garibaldi, representing the French government and the Army of the Vosges. As an officer, he took part in the defense of Colmar from Germany. Distraught over his region's defeat, over the following years he constructed a number of monuments celebrating French heroism in the defense against Germany. Among these projects was the Lion of Belfort, which he started working on in 1871, not finishing the massive sandstone statue until 1880.

In 1871, he made his first trip to the United States, where he pitched the idea of a massive statue gifted from the French to the Americans in honor of the centennial of American independence. The idea, which had first been broached to him in 1865 by his friend Édouard René de Laboulaye, resulted in the Statue of Liberty in New York harbor. After years of work and fundraising, the statue was inaugurated in 1886. During this period, Bartholdi also sculpted a number of monuments for American cities, such as a cast-iron fountain in Washington, DC completed in 1878.

Later years
In 1875, he joined the Freemasons Lodge Alsace-Lorraine in Paris. In 1876, Bartholdi was one of the French commissioners in 1876 to the Philadelphia Centennial Exposition. There he exhibited bronze statues of The Young Vine-Grower, Génie Funèbre, Peace and Genius in the Grasp of Misery, receiving a bronze medal for the latter. His 1878 statue Gribeauval became the property of the French state.

A prolific creator of statues, monuments, and portraits, Bartholdi exhibited at the Paris Salons until the year of his death in 1904. He also remained active with diverse mediums, including oil painting, watercolor, photography, and drawing, and received the rank of Commander of the Legion of Honor in 1886. Bartholdi died of tuberculosis at age 70 in Paris on 4 October 1904.

Personal life
In 1876, he married Jeanne-Emile Baheux in Providence, Rhode Island. In 1893, Bartholdi and his wife visited the 1893 World's Columbian Exposition in Chicago, where his Washington and Lafayette sculptural group was exhibited. Throughout his life Bartholdi maintained his childhood family home in Colmar; in 1922, it was made into the Musée Bartholdi.

Major projects

The Statue of Liberty (Liberty Enlightening the World)

The work for which Bartholdi is most famous is Liberty Enlightening the World, better known as the Statue of Liberty. Soon after the establishment of the French Third Republic, the project of building some suitable memorial to show the fraternal feeling existing between the republics of the United States and France was suggested, and in 1874 the Union Franco-Américaine (Franco-American Union) was established by Edouard de Laboulaye. Bartholdi's hometown in Alsace had just passed into German control in the Franco-Prussian War.  These troubles in his ancestral home of Alsace are purported to have further influenced Bartholdi's own great interest in independence, liberty, and self-determination. Bartholdi subsequently joined the Union Franco-Américaine, among whose members were Laboulaye, Paul de Rémusat, William Waddington, Henri Martin, Ferdinand Marie de Lesseps, Jean-Baptiste Donatien de Vimeur, comte de Rochambeau, Oscar Gilbert Lafayette, François Charles Lorraine, and Louis François Lorraine.

Bartholdi broached the idea of a massive statue and once its design was approved, the Union Franco-Américaine raised more than 1 million francs throughout France for its building. In 1879, Bartholdi was awarded design patent  for the Statue of Liberty. On 4 July 1880, the statue was formally delivered to the American minister in Paris, the event being celebrated by a great banquet. In October 1886, the structure was officially presented as the joint gift of the French and American people, and installed on Bedloe's Island in New York Harbor . It was rumored in France that the face of the Statue of Liberty was modeled after Bartholdi's mother. The statue is 46m high (151 feet and 1 inch), and the top of the torch is at an elevation of 93m (305 feet 1 inch) from mean low-water mark. It was the largest work of its kind that had been completed up to that time.

Works in Colmar
 
Bartholdi's hometown Colmar (modern political administrative region of Grand Est) has a number of statues and monuments by the sculptor, as well as a museum founded in 1922 in the house in which he was born, at 30 Rue des Marchands.

 Monument du Général Rapp – 1856 (first shown 1855 in Paris. Bartholdi's earliest major work)
 "Fontaine Schongauer" – 1863 (in front of the Unterlinden Museum)
 "Fontaine de l'Amiral Bruat" – 1864
 "Fontaine Roeselmann" – 1888
 "Monument Hirn" – 1894
 "Fontaine Schwendi", depicting Lazarus von Schwendi – 1898
 Les grands soutiens du monde − 1902 (statue in the courtyard of the museum)

Other major works

Bartholdi's other major works include a variety of statues at Clermont-Ferrand; in Paris, and in other places. Notable works include:

 1852: Francesca da Rimini
 1870: Le Vigneron
 1876 (plaster version in 1874) : Frieze and four angelic trumpeters on the tower of Brattle Square Church, Boston, Massachusetts, United States.
 1876: Marquis de Lafayette (or Lafayette Arriving in America), executed 1872, cast 1873 in Union Square, New York City, United States.
 1878: The Bartholdi Fountain in Bartholdi Park, the United States Botanic Garden, Washington, D.C., United States.
 1880: The Lion of Belfort, in Belfort, France, a massive sculpture of a lion depicting the huge struggle of the French to hold off the Prussian assault at the end of the Franco-Prussian War. A plaster was exhibited in 1878. Bartholdi was an officer himself during this period, attached to Garibaldi.
 1889: Switzerland Succoring Strasbourg at Basel, Switzerland, which was a gift from the French city of Strasbourg, in appreciation of the humanitarian help it had received during the Franco-Prussian War.
 1890: Statue of Liberty in Potosí, Bolivia.
 1892: Fontaine Bartholdi, on the Place des Terreaux, in Lyon, France.
 1893: Statue of Christopher Columbus, cast in silver for the 1892 Columbian Exposition in Chicago, Illinois; a bronze replica was erected in Providence, Rhode Island in 1893 and was taken down in June 2020.
 1895: Lafayette and Washington Monument," in the Place des États-Unis, Paris, and an exact replica at Morningside Park, New York City, United States.
 1903: Vercingetorix, equestrian statue in Place de Jaude, Clermont-Ferrand.

In popular culture
The Statue of Liberty is a 1985 documentary film by Ken Burns which focuses on the statue's history and its impact on society.

Bartholdi's life and creation of Liberty Enlightening the World are also featured in the 2019 documentary film, Liberty: Mother of Exiles.

See also
Musée Bartholdi
Statue of Liberty Museum

References
Notes

Sources

Further reading

 
 Blanchet, Christian. Statue of Liberty: The First Hundred Years (American Heritage Publishing Co., 1985).

 
 
 
 New York Public Library. Liberty: the French-American statue in art and history (Harper & Row, 1986).
 Price, Willadene. Bartholdi and the Statue of Liberty (Rand McNally, 1959).

External links 

 Biography by the National Gallery of Art
 The Bartholdi Fountain and Bartholdi Park – Washington, DC
 The Musée Bartholdi 
 The Statue of Liberty Enlightning the World, described by the sculptor Frédéric Bartholdy
 
 
 

1834 births
1904 deaths
People from Colmar
Alsatian-German people
20th-century deaths from tuberculosis
French Freemasons
Statue of Liberty
Tuberculosis deaths in France
French military personnel of the Franco-Prussian War
Burials at Montparnasse Cemetery
Commandeurs of the Légion d'honneur
Masterpiece Museum
19th-century French sculptors
French male sculptors